is a football stadium in Katagami, Akita Prefecture, Japan. It is one of the home stadium of football clubs Akita FC Cambiare and Saruta Kogyo [tl].

Facilities
The stadium is equipped with lighting for night matches. The artificial turf, model XP-62,  is manufactured by Sumitomo Rubber Industries.

Access
 JR Oga Line Kamifutada Station
 Michinoeki Tenno has 605 parking spaces.

References

External links

Football venues in Japan
Akita FC Cambiare
Blaublitz Akita
Katagami, Akita
Saruta Kogyo SC
Sports venues in Akita Prefecture
Sports venues completed in 2011
2011 establishments in Japan